MDA Ltd. is a Canadian space technology company headquartered in Brampton, Ontario, Canada, that provides geointelligence, robotics & space operations, and satellite systems.

History 
MDA (formerly MacDonald, Dettwiler and Associates) was founded in 1969 by John S. MacDonald and Vern Dettwiler in the basement of MacDonald's Vancouver home. The company became a subsidiary of Orbital Sciences Corporation (OSC) from the United States on 17 November 1995.

MDA was primary contractor for, and took ownership of, the RADARSAT-2 Earth observation satellite.

MDA bought the space robotics division of Spar Aerospace—manufacturer of the Canadarm—in March 1999, renaming it MD Robotics. The company completed the Mobile Servicing System (including the Canadarm2) for the International Space Station. OSC sold its entire stake in 2001. Nearly 70% was sold to a group of Canadian investors; the Ontario Teachers' Pension Plan (OTPP) became the largest shareholder with a 29% stake.

In the 2000s, MDA experienced difficulties winning contracts in the United States. In 2008, an attempt to sell the space division to Alliant Techsystems was blocked by the Canadian government on national security grounds. The subsequent lack of Canadian business led to layoffs. The real estate information business was sold in early 2011. MDA bought Space Systems/Loral from Loral Space & Communications in 2012., leading to OTPP reducing its stake to less than 10%.

MDA bought DigitalGlobe in 2017, and rebranded as Maxar Technologies.; the company moved its headquarters to Colorado, United States.

On 9 December 2020, The Canadian Space Agency (CSA) awarded MDA a contract to develop and construct the Canadarm3 as part of Canada's contribution to the NASA-led Lunar Gateway Program. The contract is for the first phase of the program and is worth C$22.8 million, with options for follow-on phases.  The contract was further confirmed on December 16, 2020, when NASA and the CSA announced the finalised agreement to collaborate on the Gateway, which included the Canadarm3, the installation of two scientific instruments and commitment to provide two crew positions for Canadian astronauts.

On 7 April 2021, MDA became a publicly traded company on the Toronto Stock Exchange trading under the symbol MDA.

Facilities

Canada 
 Brampton, ON (HQ)
 Dartmouth, NS
 Kanata, ON
 Montreal, QC
 Ottawa, ON
 Richmond, BC

International offices 
 Didcot, United Kingdom
 Houston, TX

References 

Aerospace companies of Canada
Companies listed on the Toronto Stock Exchange
Space industry companies of Canada
Companies based in Brampton
Manufacturing companies established in 1969
Canadian companies established in 1969
1969 establishments in British Columbia
Manufacturing companies based in Ontario